Thomas King or Tom King may refer to:

Politicians
 Thomas King (died 1688), English merchant and politician
 Thomas King (died 1725), Member of Parliament for Queenborough, son of the above
 Thomas Butler King (1800–1864), American politician from Georgia
 Thomas King (New Zealand politician) (1821–1893), New Zealand politician
 Thomas King (Australian politician) (1833–1886), South Australian Minister of Education from 1878 to 1881
 Thomas King (Canadian politician) (1879–1972), merchant, farmer and politician in British Columbia, Canada
 Thomas King (novelist) (born 1943), Canadian writer and broadcast presenter
 Thomas R. King (fl. 1943–44), Chairman of the Democratic Party of Wisconsin
 Tom King, Baron King of Bridgwater (born 1933), British Conservative politician
 Tom King (Mississippi politician) (born 1947), Mississippi Transportation Commissioner, former state senator

Sports
 Thomas King (boxer) (1835–1888), English boxer, Heavyweight Champion of England
 Tom King (basketball) (1924–2015), American professional basketball player
 Tom King (footballer) (born 1995), Association football goalkeeper
 Tom King (sailor) (born 1973), Australian sailing gold medalist at the 2000 Summer Olympics
 Tom King (American football) (1895–1972), American college football and basketball player and coach

Others
 Thomas Joseph King (army officer) (1891–1971), New Zealand army officer
 Tom King (highwayman) (died 1737), English highwayman
 Thomas King (actor) (1730–1805), English actor, theatre manager and dramatist
 Thomas A. King (1921–2012), Rear Admiral and first graduate of the United States Merchant Marine Academy
 Thomas Starr King (1824–1864), American Unitarian minister, influential in California politics during the American Civil War
 Thomas King (astronomer) (1858–1916), New Zealand astronomer
 Thomas King (botanist) (1834–1896), Scottish botanist
 Thomas Joseph King (1921–2000), American biologist
 Thomas J. King Jr. (1925–1994), American educator and Shakespearean scholar
 Thomas M. King (1929–2009), American Jesuit priest and scholar of theology and philosophy at Georgetown University
 Thomas King (merchant), British merchant and privateer
 Thomas King (novelist) (born 1943), Canadian novelist and broadcaster
 Thomas King (slave trader), British slave-trader
 Thomas Wilkinson King (1809–1847), English pathologist and anatomist
 Tom King (musician) (1942–2011), songwriter, founding member of the 1960s rock band The Outsiders
 Tom King (writer) (born 1978), novelist and comic book writer
 Harry Balk or Tom King (1925–2016), American record producer and songwriter

Fictional people
 Tom King (Emmerdale), a character in the British soap opera Emmerdale

Locations 

 Tom King Bayou
 Tom King Bayou Bridge